Fighting for Our Lives is a 1975 documentary film produced and directed by Glen Pearcy. The film documents the striking of California grape workers from Coachella to Fresno as they negotiate for a United Farm Workers (UFW) contract in 1973. The film also depicts their non-violent struggle against police brutality on the picket lines. It was nominated for the 1976 Academy Award for Best Documentary Feature.

References

External links

    

1975 films
1975 documentary films
American documentary films
1970s English-language films
1970s American films